Seung-hwa is a Korean masculine given name. Its meaning differs based on the hanja used to write each syllable of the name. There are 15 hanja with the reading "seung" and 15 hanja with the reading "hwa" on the South Korean government's official list of hanja which may be registered for use in given names.

People with this name include:
Jeong Seung-hwa (1926–2002), South Korean male general
Na Seung-hwa (born 1969), South Korean male footballer
Park Seung-hwa (born 1969), South Korean male singer, member of Yurisangja
Jung Seung-hwa (born 1981), South Korean male épée fencer

See also
List of Korean given names

References

Korean masculine given names